EVAS Air, also known as Exploits Valley Air Services or EVAS, is a Canadian aviation services company, based in Gander, Newfoundland and Labrador.

It provides a variety of services, including a flight school (known as Gander Flight Training), sightseeing flights, and maintenance.

EVAS has started a courier route within Atlantic Canada. Using one of their Beechcraft 1900 aircraft, the run serves Newfoundland and Labrador, Nova Scotia and New Brunswick.

Former destinations
Previously EVAS served the following destinations as Air Canada Express.
Newfoundland and Labrador
Deer Lake - Deer Lake Regional Airport
Gander - Gander International Airport
Happy Valley-Goose Bay - Goose Bay Airport
St. John's - St. John's International Airport
Wabush (Labrador City) - Wabush Airport
Nova Scotia
Halifax - Halifax Stanfield International Airport
New Brunswick
Moncton - Greater Moncton Roméo LeBlanc International Airport
Fredericton - Fredericton International Airport
Saint John - Saint John Airport
Prince Edward Island
Charlottetown - Charlottetown Airport

Fleet
As of March 2023 EVAS has 27 aircraft registered with Transport Canada. At the EVAS website they state they operate de Havilland Canada DHC-6 Twin Otter and Embraer Phenom 100. However, the do not give a total number of aircraft and they are not registered with Transport Canada.

EVAS previously flown aircraft include;
Beech A100
Cessna 337
de Havilland DHC-2 Beaver
Pezetel M18 (Dromader)
Schweizer 269

References

External links

Official website
Gander Flight Training

Regional airlines of Atlantic Canada
Companies based in Newfoundland and Labrador
Gander, Newfoundland and Labrador